Khanbal is a town in Kupwara district, Jammu and Kashmir, India.

Geography

Location
National Highway 1B ends at Khanbal.

References

External links
 Satellite map of Kupwara

Cities and towns in Kupwara district